The 1925 Loyola Green and Gray Maryland football team was an American football team that represented Loyola College Maryland as an independent during the 1925 college football season.  In its first season under head coach Stan Cofall, the team compiled a 2–6 record.

Schedule

References

Loyola
Loyola Greyhounds football seasons
Loyola Green and Gray football